Hanklyn-Janklin is a 1992 glossary of Indian English terms and Indian-derived words in mainstream English by Nigel Hankin, named as a tribute to its 1886 forebear Hobson-Jobson.

References

External links
 Details at publisher's site

English dictionaries
Indian English
Languages of India